The CRFU Cornwall Cup (currently sponsored by Tribute Ales) is an annual rugby union knock-out cup club competition organised by the Cornwall Rugby Football Union first played for in 1896 but only regularly since 1969. It is open for teams based in Cornwall that are ranked below the national leagues (tier 6–8) but above the Cornish regional divisions (tier 9–10). Tier 9 to 10 clubs have their own competition in the Cornish Clubs Cup.

Until 2006–07 all of the top rugby union teams in Cornwall including the Cornish Pirates, Launceston and Redruth played in the competition, up until the formation of the Cornwall Super Cup in 2007–08. Although the Cornwall Super Cup is now a two-legged competition between only two sides, the national Cornish clubs have kept away from the CRFU Cornwall Cup as the demands of the modern game have increased over the years.

The current format is as a knock-out cup with a 1st round, quarter-final, semi-final and final which is held at a neutral venue in April.  Due to the odd numbers of teams involved, several teams receive byes during the early stages.

CRFU Cornwall Cup

Number of wins
 Redruth (10)
 Camborne (10)
 St Ives (9)
 Launceston (8)
 Penryn (5)
 Wadebridge Camels (4)
 Penzance/Newlyn (3)
 Falmouth (2)
 Penzance (2)
 St Austell (1)
 Truro (1)

1896–97

1897–98

1898–99

See also

 Cornwall RFU
 Cornwall Clubs Cup
 Cornwall Super Cup
 English rugby union system
 Rugby union in England

Notes

References

External links
 Trelawny's Army

Recurring sporting events established in 1967
Rugby union cup competitions in England
Rugby union in Cornwall